Cacique Aramare Airport  is an airport serving Puerto Ayacucho, the capital of the Amazonas state in Venezuela. The airport and city are on the Orinoco River, locally the border between Venezuela and Colombia.

The Puerto Ayacucho VOR (Ident: PAY) and Puerto Ayacucho non-directional beacon (Ident: PAY) are located on the field.

Airlines and destinations

See also
Transport in Venezuela
List of airports in Venezuela

References

External links
OurAirports - Cacique
SkyVector - Puerto Ayacucho
OpenStreetMap - Puerto Cacique
 

Airports in Venezuela
Buildings and structures in Amazonas (Venezuelan state)
Buildings and structures in Puerto Ayacucho